Výborná is a village and municipality in Kežmarok District in the Prešov Region of north Slovakia.

History
In historical records the village was first mentioned in 1289.

Geography
The municipality lies at an altitude of 706 metres and covers an area of 10.544 km² . It has a population of about 1070 people.

External links
http://vyborna.e-obce.sk

References

Villages and municipalities in Kežmarok District